The district "Liwaa" (plural Alwiya ألوية) are the administrative centres ("chief towns") in Jordan. The twelve governorates of Jordan contain fifty-two alwiya which are listed below by governorate. In many cases the name of the chief town is the same as the name of the district (liwa) or sub-district (qda) administered.

Central Jordan

Amman Governorate
Amman
Al-Jiza
Al-Muwwaqqar
Na'oor
Al-Quesmah
Sahab
Marka
Wadi al-Sayr
Al-Jami'ah

Balqa Governorate
Mahes & Fuhais
Albasha
As-Salt
Dair Alla

Madaba Governorate
Dhiban
Madaba

Zarqa Governorate
Russeifa
Az-Zarqa
Hashemiyah

North Jordan

Ajlun Governorate
Ajlun
Kofranjah

Irbid Governorate
Irbid
Al-Ramtha
Al-Aghwar Shamaliyyeh
Bani Kinanah
Bani Obeid
Kora
Mazar Shamaliyyeh
Tayybeh
Wastiyyeh

Jerash Governorate
Jerash

Mafraq Governorate
Al-Mafraq
Ar-Ruwayshid
Badiah Shamaliyah
Badiah Sh.Gh.District

South Jordan

Aqaba Governorate
Al-Aqaba
Al-Quwayra

Karak Governorate
Al-Karak
Qatraneh
Ayy'
Faqqu'
Al-Mazar al-Janubiyya
Al-Qasr
Aghwar Janoobiyah

Ma'an Governorate
Ma'an
Petra
Al-Husanyniyya
Ash-Shibek

Tafilah Governorate
Al-Tafila
Al-Hasa
Birsayra

See also
Governorates of Jordan

References

 
Jordan geography-related lists
Subdistricts, Jordan